Sonam Bhutia (born 26 January 1994) is an Indian professional footballer who plays as a midfielder for Machhindra FC in the Martyr's Memorial A-Division League.

Club career

Early career
Born and brought up in Shotak, Sikkim, Sonam Bhutia is a product of the Sports Authority of India, Namchi. He was part of the SAI squad that participated in the Subroto Cup in 2008. Though his team lost in the semi-final stage, Sonam who played in central defense got a scholarship for good performance.

Bhutia had a brief stint at the Mohun Bagan SAIL Football Academy. When Mohun Bagan SAIL Football Academy went to participate in a tournament at Namchi, Shyam Thapa spotted Sonam and selected him for the Durgapur based Mohun Bagan Academy. However, after 4 months, Sonam went back to Namchi because of his schooling. Though Sonam got offer from United Sikkim around 4–5 years back, he joined the club in 2012 after completing his studies and played there for a couple of seasons.

He represented Sikkim in the Santosh Trophy for 3 consecutive seasons from 2009 onwards. He also appeared in the 2018–19 National Football Championship (73rd edition of Santosh Trophy), in which Sikkim qualified for the final round for the first time since 2004. He was selected in the U-23 Indian Camp held at Bangalore last year, but due to passport issues, he was not kept in the final squad.

He also appeared with Ulkha Football Club of Siliguri, at the Siliguri Super Division League.

United Sikkim
Bhutia made his debut for United Sikkim FC on 24 January 2013 during an I-League match against Mohun Bagan at the Salt Lake Stadium in Kolkata, West Bengal in which he came on as a 69th-minute substitute for Sandesh Jhingan; United Sikkim drew the match 0–0.

In March 2013, Nathan Hall managed United Sikkim went to Bhutan for training. With the team, Bhutia played three friendly matches against local sides Drukpol FC, Yeedzin and Zimdra, at the Changlimithang Stadium in Thimpu. From July to August 2013, he went to Bhutan again and participated in 2013 King's Cup, in which they moved to the knockout stages. In the first semi-final, United Sikkim lost 2–4 to Manang Marshyangdi of Nepal.

Mohun Bagan
In August 2014, Sonam joined Mohun Bagan, and appeared in the Calcutta Football League.

Mohammedan
On 2 August 2016, it was announced that Bhutia had signed with Mohammedan. He was part of the team, that clinched 36th Sikkim Governor's Gold Cup, defeating Jhapa XI of Nepal 1–0 at the Paljor Stadium.

Langsning
On 1 July 2017, Bhutia moved to Shillong Premier League side Langsning SC.

Southern Samity
In July 2021, he moved to another Calcutta Football League side Southern Samity.

Machhindra
In December 2021, Bhutia moved to Nepal and signed with Martyr's Memorial A-Division League side Machhindra F.C. on a season-long deal. He debuted on 2 January 2022, in their 1–0 win against Nepal Police Club. Later Machhindra lifted the league trophy and earned a spot in the 2022 AFC Cup qualifying play-offs.

On 5 April, Machhindra appeared in the match against Blue Star of Sri Lanka at the Dasharath Rangasala Stadium but bowed out of the tournament losing 2–1.

Career statistics

Club
Statistics accurate as of 12 May 2013

Honours
United Sikkim
I-League 2nd Division: 2012
Sikkim Premier Division League: 2013; runner-up 2014

Mohun Bagan
Federation Cup: 2015–16

Mohamedan Sporting
Sikkim Governor's Gold Cup: 2016

Macchindra
Martyr's Memorial A-Division League: 2021–22

See also
List of Indian football players in foreign leagues
Indian Nepalis

References

External links

Sonam Bhutia at Hamrokhelkud

News on Sonam Bhutia at Facebook (Goalie365)

Indian footballers
1994 births
Living people
People from Gangtok district
Footballers from Sikkim
I-League players
United Sikkim F.C. players
Mohun Bagan AC players
Mohammedan SC (Kolkata) players
Machhindra F.C. players
Association football defenders
Indian expatriate footballers
Expatriate footballers in Nepal